Diethylene glycol dinitrate (DEGDN) is an explosive nitrated alcohol ester with the formula C4H8N2O7. While chemically similar to numerous other high explosives, pure diethylene glycol dinitrate is difficult to ignite or detonate. Ignition typically requires localized heating to the decomposition point unless the DEGDN is first atomized.

Preparation and uses 
Diethylene glycol dinitrate can be made by nitration of diethylene glycol with nitric acid in presence of a dehydrating agent like concentrated sulfuric acid.

DEGDN can be mixed with nitrocellulose or nitroglycol to form a colloid, which is used in smokeless powder for artillery and rocket propellant. During World War II, the Kriegsmarine frequently used this mixture in their artillery. It has also found use as desensitizing plasticizer because it contributes to the power of the mixture while stabilizing the explosives.

Toxicity 
If ingested, like nitroglycerine, it rapidly causes vasodilation through the release of nitric oxide, a physiological signaling molecule that relaxes smooth muscle. Consequently, diethylene glycol dinitrate has occasionally been used medically to relieve angina, which is substernal chest pain associated with impaired cardiac circulation. The rationale is that the concurrent headache it induces is somewhat less severe than other nitro compounds.

Uses 
At present, interest in the chemical seems to be mostly historical: more potent perchlorate–metal mixtures have long since supplanted it as a solid propellant; safer explosives have replaced nitroglycerine, true dynamites (the term is often used generically, even by experienced field technicians, to refer to almost any explosive supplied in small, discrete packages) retaining only a few specialist uses. The medical application was never widespread, the standard nitroglycerine being faster acting and very inexpensive; oral nitrates in any case being only palliative, not an effective treatment.

Triethylene glycol dinitrate, diethylene glycol dinitrate, and trimethylolethane trinitrate are being considered as replacements for nitroglycerin in propellants.

See also
 TNT equivalent
 RE factor

References

W. H. Rinkenbach, Industrial Engineering Chemistry v19 p925 (1927) Note: the present author has transliterated some terminology and notation in line with modern practice.
Military applications referenced in Encyclopedia of Weapons of World War 2; Gen. Ed. Chris Bishop, c.2003 Friedman/Fairfax NYNY, 

Nitrate esters
Propellants
Monopropellants
Explosive chemicals
Liquid explosives
Plasticizers
Antianginals